James Higgins (born ) is a former professional rugby league footballer who played in the 1940s and 1950s.

Playing career

Challenge Cup Final appearances
Jim Higgins played right-, i.e. number 10, in Wakefield Trinity's 13-12 victory over Wigan in the 1946 Challenge Cup Final during the 1945–46 season at Wembley Stadium, London on Saturday 4 May 1946, in front of a crowd of 54,730.

County Cup Final appearances
Jim Higgins played right-, i.e. number 10, in Wakefield Trinity's 2-5 defeat by Bradford Northern in the 1945 Yorkshire County Cup Final during the 1945–46 season at Thrum Hall, Halifax on Saturday 3 November 1945, played right- in the 10–0 victory over Hull F.C. in the 1946 Yorkshire County Cup Final during the 1946–47 season at Headingley Rugby Stadium, Leeds on Saturday 31 November 1946, played right- in the 7–7 draw with Leeds in the 1947 Yorkshire County Cup Final during the 1947–48 season at Fartown Ground, Huddersfield on Saturday 1 November 1947, and played right- in the 8–7 victory over Leeds in the 1947 Yorkshire County Cup Final replay during the 1947–48 season at Odsal Stadium, Bradford on Wednesday 5 November 1947.

Contemporaneous Article Extract
"Formerly a centre with Greenacres Junior side, he joined Trinity in 1945 from St. Mary's Juniors (Oldham) and immediately became first-choice blind-side prop forward. It was a position he held regularly for eight seasons in which he gave great service and consistent endeavour."

References

External links
Search for "Higgins" at rugbyleagueproject.org

Wakefield Trinity players
English rugby league players
Rugby league props
Rugby league hookers
1920s births
Year of birth uncertain
Possibly living people
Place of birth missing